is a Japanese manga series written and illustrated by Hiroyuki Takei. It was serialized in Shueisha's Jump X from April 2012 to October 2014, with its chapters collected in six tankōbon volumes. An anime television series by Bridge is set to premiere in January 2024.

Media

Manga
Shaman King: Flowers, written and illustrated by Hiroyuki Takei, was serialized in Shueisha's Jump X from April 10, 2012, to October 10, 2014. Shueisha collected its chapters in six tankōbon volumes, released from August 10, 2012, to December 19, 2014. Kodansha republished the volumes digitally in 2019.

In July 2020, Kodansha USA announced the digital English language release of the Shaman Kings spin-offs, and Shaman King: Flowers was originally scheduled to be released on August 11, 2020, however, it was delayed to October 20 of the same year. Its six volumes were then published between October 20 and December 22, 2020.

Volume list

Anime
After the last episode of the reboot of the original series, a sequel was announced. In March 2023, an anime television series adaptation was confirmed. The staff from the reboot are reprising their roles with Mayuko Yamamoto designing the characters and is set to premiere on TV Tokyo in January 2024.

References

External links
Official website at Jump X 

Anime series based on manga
Bridge (studio)
Kodansha manga
Seinen manga
Shaman King
Shueisha manga
Upcoming anime television series